The Battle of the Three Kings (also known as Drums of Fire) is a 1990 Soviet-Italian-Spanish-Moroccan historical adventure-drama film directed by Souheil Ben-Barka and Uchkun Nazarov and starring Massimo Ghini and Ángela Molina. It depicts real life events of the Saadi Sultan of Morocco Abd el Malek I.

Plot 
The film tells the story of the Saadi dynasty prince Abdelmalek, exiled from Morocco by his brothers. Since his exile, he will live twenty adventurous years: fight the Spanish Inquisition, take part in the Battle of Lepanto, be incarcerated in Alicante prison, and assist in the Conquest of Tunis. Eventually, he returns to Morocco to fulfill his destiny.

Cast 

Massimo Ghini - as Abd el Malek 
Ángela Molina - as Sophie
F. Murray Abraham - as Osrain
Ugo Tognazzi - as Carlo di Palma
Fernando Rey - as Pope Paul V
Claudia Cardinale - as Roxelane
Irene Papas - as Lalla Sahaba
Harvey Keitel - as Sandobal
Souad Amidou - as Meryem
Olegar Fedoro - as Father Tebaldo
Joaquín Hinojosa - as Akalay
Sergey Bondarchuk - as Selim
Viktor Korolev - as Monelo

See also
Battle of Ksar El Kebir

References

External links

Spanish historical drama films
1990 drama films
1990 films
1990s historical drama films
Films set in the 16th century
Soviet multilingual films
Italian multilingual films
Spanish multilingual films
Soviet historical drama films
Italian historical drama films
Moroccan drama films
English-language Italian films
English-language Soviet films
English-language Spanish films
1990s English-language films
1990s Spanish films